Adele Live was the second concert tour by English singer-songwriter Adele. She visited Europe and North America, the tour supported her second studio album, 21. Adele was backed by a five-piece band and backing singers, whilst for some songs she was accompanied by piano only. The setlist comprised all songs from 21, except for "He Won't Go", as well as selected songs from 19. The shows garnered positive critical reviews, many of which emphasised the show's understated nature, as well as the singer's vocal performance and accessible persona.

Recurring health and vocal problems led to numerous alterations to the tour itinerary. The first European leg of the tour was uninterrupted. However, for the first North American leg, which was originally scheduled from 12 May 2011 in Washington, D.C. to 22 June in Minneapolis, Adele canceled the last nine dates of her tour after she was diagnosed with acute laryngitis. These dates were rescheduled with some additional dates and some larger venues. The tour was sold out quickly across North America and Europe, and received positive reviews.

In September 2011, "continuing problems with a serious cold and chest infection" prompted the postponement of seven additional dates on the second leg of the European stop. However, the tour was resumed on 13 September, and new dates for the missed shows were rescheduled. In October 2011, the singer again cancelled the remaining dates of the second leg of her North American tour due to a vocal hemorrhage that caused internal bleeding near her vocal cords. Adele was forced to cancel the remaining dates of her tour to undergo throat surgery for her hemorrhaging.

Background 
Production designer Rob Sinclair wanted the stage to be sparse so the audience would focus on Adele and her voice. The back wall of the stage featured a "distinctive" wall of 96 cone-shaped lampshades using 60-watt household lightbulbs to illuminate them. Each lamp was individually dimmed and the bulbs of each lamp were dipped in a special rubber solution so they wouldn't break. The rest of the show featured moving lights and much white light to focus on Adele at the center of the stage. The moving lights were designed so that they didn't appear to move from the audience's point-of-view and were powered by Jands Vista's next-generation Vista v2 software. The decision to focus on sculpted white light for the stage won "considerable acclaim."

The tour was minimalist in every aspect, from stage design to using each venue's own sound system rather than transporting a tour-specific system. The front-of-house engineer for the tour was Dave McDonald. McDonald carried an Allen & Heath iLive-112 with him during the tour and hooked it up to each venue's sound system with a Cat 5 connector. This allowed the tour to travel light and allowed McDonald to control the mix for each show using each venue's systems. McDonald used plug-ins to replicate the sound of vintage ENT plates for the sound. The tour chose to only use Sennheiser microphones. McDonald chose to have Adele use a wireless Sennheiser SKM 2000 system with an SKM 500–965 G3 transmitter. For the back-up singers, McDonald chose hardwired Sennheiser e 935s. The guitarists used Avalon DIs and the piano was a "gag piano", lacquered upright to look traditional but actually housed a Yamaha MO. McDonald's goal for the tour was, "I want the audience to forget who they are for a moment and be able to project themselves solely onto what's occurring onstage. That is, after all, why we go to shows."

The tour featured a 12-piece string section that backed Adele up, consisting of eight violins, two violas, and two cellos. During some performances, a 20-ft mirrorball (named "Mirrorball Mike") descended from the ceiling during the encore. A screen lifted up at the beginning of the concert to reveal Adele and occasionally descended behind her with images projected upon it. During "Hometown Glory", an image of St. Paul's Cathedral was projected onto the screen.

Opening acts 
 The Civil Wars (North America, leg 1, select dates and United Kingdom, leg 2)
 Plan B (North America, leg 1, select dates)
 Wanda Jackson (North America, leg 2, select dates)
 Amos Lee (United Kingdom, leg 2)
 Michael Kiwanuka (United Kingdom, leg 2)

Setlist 

 "Hometown Glory"
 "I'll Be Waiting"
 "Don't You Remember"
 "Turning Tables"
 "Set Fire to the Rain"
 "Daydreamer"
 "If It Hadn't Been for Love"
 "My Same"
 "Take It All"
 "Rumour Has It"
 "Right as Rain"
 "One and Only"
 "Lovesong"
 "Chasing Pavements"
 "Make You Feel My Love"
Encore
 "Someone like You"
 "Rolling in the Deep"

Source:

Notes

Shows 

Festivals and other miscellaneous performances
This concert was a part of the London Pride
This concert was a part of the iTunes Festival

Cancellations and rescheduled shows

Box office score data

Broadcasts and recordings 
The concert at The Roundhouse (a part of the iTunes Festival) was streamed live on iTunes. The event was followed with an EP release entitled iTunes Festival: London 2011. The album showcases an abbreviated concert with the songs; "One and Only", "Don't You Remember", "Rumour Has It", "Take It All", "I Can't Make You Love Me" and "Rolling in the Deep". The album is an iTunes exclusive and was made available for download on 14 July 2011. A DVD/Blu-ray/CD entitled Live at the Royal Albert Hall was released on 28 November 2011. It features the entire concert along with behind the scenes footage.

Personnel 
 Adele: Vocals, guitar on "Daydreamer" and occasionally "My Same"
 Ben Thomas: Guitar
 Tim Van Der Kuil: Guitar
 Miles Robertson: Keyboards
 Sam Dixon: Bass guitar
 Derrick Wright: Drums
 Kelli-Leigh Henry-Davila, Sharleen Linton: Background vocals
 David "Zop" Yard: Tour manager
 Pat Baker: Production manager
 Rob Sinclair: Production designer
 George Sinclair: Associate designer
 Dave McDonald: Front-of-house engineer
 Joe Campbell: Monitor engineer
 Adam Newman & Adam Carr: Stage techs

Source: Adele's Official Myspace

References

External links
 

2011 concert tours
Adele concert tours